Anders G. Aldrin (1889–1970) was a Swedish born American artist, active from 1926 to 1970.  The majority of his work was in painting, watercolors and wood block prints. He emigrated to the United States in 1911. In 1917, he joined the United States Army and served in France, becoming a naturalized citizen.  After recovering from tuberculosis in Arizona, he entered Otis Art Institute in 1923.  Respected by critics and artists alike, he chose an independent path for his work not wanting to be tied to a style or movement.  But he can easily be placed as a member of the California Scene Painting artists, as he preferred to work out in nature.  His work can be found in a number of museums.

References

1889 births
1970 deaths
American printmakers
Landscape artists
Swedish emigrants to the United States